The 2021 WAFF U-23 Championship is an international football tournament held in Saudi Arabia from 4 to 12 October 2021. It is the second edition of the U-23 age group competition organised by the West Asian Football Federation. 

The eleven national teams involved in the tournament were required to register a squad of at most 23 players, including three goalkeepers. Only players in these squads were eligible to take part in the tournament. Players born on or after 1 January 1998 were eligible to compete in the tournament.

The full squad listings are below. The age listed for each player is on 4 October 2021, the first day of the tournament. The nationality for each club reflects the national association (not the league) to which the club is affiliated. A flag is included for coaches who are of a different nationality than their own national team. Players in boldface were capped at full international level prior to being called up.

Group A

Kuwait 
Coach:  Carlos González

The preliminary squad was announced on 22 September 2021.

Oman 
Coach:  Dario Bašić

The squad was announced on 23 September 2021.

Jordan 
Coach: Ahmad Hayel

The squad was announced on 30 September 2021.

Yemen 
Coach: Amin Al-Sanini

The squad was announced on 27 September 2021.

Group B

Lebanon 
Coach: Jamal Taha

The squad was announced on 1 October 2021.

Iraq 
Coach:  Miroslav Soukup

The squad was announced on 30 September 2021.

Palestine 
Coach: Ehab Abu Jazar

United Arab Emirates 
Coach:  Denis Silva

The squad was announced on 30 September 2021.

Group C

Bahrain 
Coach: Ismail Karami

The squad was announced on 3 October 2021.

Saudi Arabia 
Coach: Saad Al-Shehri

The squad was announced on 29 September 2021.

Syria 
Coach: Rafat Muhammad

The squad was announced on 2 October 2021.

References

WAFF Championship
Football in the Arab world
International association football competitions in the Middle East by host
International association football competitions in Asia by host